The Federal Correctional Complex, Yazoo City (FCC Yazoo City) is a United States federal prison complex for male offenders in unincorporated Yazoo County, Mississippi. It consists of:

 Federal Correctional Institution, Yazoo City Low (FCI Yazoo City Low): a low-security facility with an adjacent satellite prison camp houses for minimum-security offenders.
 Federal Correctional Institution, Yazoo City Medium (FCI Yazoo City Medium): a medium-security facility, with an adjacent satellite prison camp for minimum-security offenders.
 United States Penitentiary, Yazoo City (USP Yazoo City): a high-security facility.

FCC Yazoo City is located 36 miles north of Jackson, Mississippi, the state capital.

Notable incidents
In 2008, a joint investigation conducted by the Bureau of Prisons Office of Inspector General and the Department of Justice revealed that Raymond Morton, a correctional officer at FCI Yazoo City, had accepted bribes from an inmate whom the Bureau of Prisons did not identify. Morton was indicted on April 8, 2008, for agreeing to receive and accept bribes from a federal inmate.  He subsequently pleaded guilty to the charge in federal court and was sentenced to probation.

On February 26, 2013, Robert Kale Johnson, a former correctional officer at FCI Yazoo City, was sentenced to 15 months in prison followed by 3 years of supervised release for taking a $5,000 bribe in exchange for bringing contraband into the facility. Johnson was released in June 2014.

On March 25, 2010, Dashun Temple, a correction officer at the FCC Yazoo City, Mississippi, pleaded guilty to Workman's Compensation Fraud in federal court. Claiming that he had suffered a back injury from lifting boxes, Temple admitted submitting fraudulent medical travel refund requests to the Department of Labor from December 2007 through August 2008. Temple claimed that he had traveled from his home in Pearl, Mississippi to a medical clinic in Woodville, Mississippi on 84 different occasions. An investigation revealed through the records of the clinic that Temple had only made 5 legitimate trips, thus leaving 79 trips as fraudulent. Temple received a total of $11,595.76 in reimbursements. Temple was terminated, ordered to pay restitution, and sentenced to probation.

Notable inmates

Current

Former

See also

 List of U.S. federal prisons
 Federal Bureau of Prisons
 Incarceration in the United States

References

Federal Correctional Institutions in the United States
Prisons in Mississippi
Buildings and structures in Yazoo County, Mississippi